Henry Courtenay Fenn, more commonly known as H. C. Fenn, (February 26, 1894 – July 1978) was an American sinologist and architect of Yale University's Chinese language program.

H. C. Fenn was the son of the Reverend Dr. Courtenay Hughes Fenn, missionary to China and compiler of The Five Thousand Dictionary, and his wife Alice Holstein May Fenn, and grew up in Peking. He married Constance Latimer Sargent on January 27, 1925. Fenn was active in the "Yale system" of Chinese grammar developed by himself, George Kennedy, Gardner Tewksbury, Wang Fangyu and others working in the Institute of Far Eastern Languages at Yale in the late 1940s.

Selected works
 Songs from Hypnia, Henry C. Fenn, 1915
 A Syllabus of the History of Chinese Civilization and Culture, by L. C. Goodrich and H. C. Fenn, 1929, 1941
 Beginning Chinese, by John De Francis, edited by Henry C. Fenn and George A. Kennedy, 1946
 Chinese characters easily confused, Henry C. Fenn, 1953
 Chinese dialogues, edited by Henry C. Fenn & Pao-che`n Lee, 1953
 Speak Mandarin, by Henry C. Fenn and Gardner M. Tewksbury, Yale University Press, New Haven, Conn., 1967
 "Introduction to Chinese Sentence Structure," by Henry C. Fenn, date unknown.

1894 births
1978 deaths
American sinologists
Yale University faculty
Children of American missionaries in China